Scream with a View is an EP by Tuxedomoon, independently released in 1979. It was re-released on ExpandedMusic (Italy) in 1983, and on Cramboy in 1985.

Track listing

Personnel 
Adapted from the Scream with a View liner notes.

Tuxedomoon
 Michael Belfer – guitar (A1, A2), synthesizer (B1, B2), drum programming (B2), Moog Taurus (B2), lead vocals (B2), design
 Steven Brown – soprano saxophone (A1, B2), lead vocals (A2, B1), synthesizer (A1), Synare electronic drums (A2)
 Peter Dachert – bass guitar (A1, A2, B1), piano (B1), backing vocals (B1)
 Blaine L. Reininger – drum programming (A1, A2, B1), lead vocals (A1), violin (A1), synthesizer (A2), rototoms (B1), Synare electronic drums (B1), backing vocals (B1)

Production and additional personnel
 Mark Lee Baker – executive producer
 Richard Peterson – photography
 Patrick Roques – design
 Tuxedomoon – production, engineering, mixing

Release history

References

External links 
 

1979 EPs
Tuxedomoon albums
Crammed Discs albums